The 1895 Richmond Colts football team was an American football team that represented Richmond College—now known as the University of Richmond—as an independent during the 1895 college football season. Led by Dana Rucker in his fourth and final season as head coach, Richmond compiled a record of 0–5–1. For the second straight season, the team was winless.

Schedule

References

Richmond
Richmond Spiders football seasons
College football winless seasons
Richmond Spiders football